Cieszeniewo  is a village in the administrative district of Gmina Świdwin, within Świdwin County, West Pomeranian Voivodeship, in north-western Poland.

For the history of the region, see History of Pomerania.

The village has a population of 220.

Notable residents
 Ernst von Rüchel (1754–1823), Prussian general

References

Cieszeniewo